Lazenay is a commune in the Cher department in the Centre-Val de Loire region of France.

Geography

Population

Sights
 The church of Notre-Dame, dating from the sixteenth century.
 The château of La Ferté, built in 1659.
 Two watermills.

Personalities
Rémy Pointereau, politician, was born here on 30 March 1953.

See also
Communes of the Cher department

References

Communes of Cher (department)
Bituriges Cubi